Xenolea is a genus of longhorn beetles of the subfamily Lamiinae, containing the following species:

 Xenolea asiatica (Pic, 1925)
 Xenolea collaris J. Thomson, 1864
 Xenolea tomentosa (Pascoe, 1864)

References

Lamiinae